The 1973 San Jose State Spartans football team represented California State University, San Jose during the 1973 NCAA Division I football season as a member of the Pacific Coast Athletic Association. The team was led by first year head coach Darryl Rogers. They played home games at Spartan Stadium in San Jose, California. The Spartans finished the season with a record of five wins, four losses and two ties (5–4–2, 2–0–2 PCAA).

Schedule

Team players in the NFL
The following were selected in the 1974 NFL Draft.

Notes

References

San Jose State
San Jose State Spartans football seasons
San Jose State Spartans football